John Keeton (born 19 May 1972) is a British former professional boxer who competed from 1993 to 2009. He held the British cruiserweight title and challenged twice for the Commonwealth cruiserweight title between 2006 and 2007.

Boxing career

Early professional career
Keeton had his first professional contest on 11 August 1993, scoring a stoppage win over Tony Colclough in Mansfield. For the first three years of his career Keeton's results were a mixture of victories and defeats losing to the likes of Julius Francis, Bruce Scott and Nicky Piper. Following the Piper defeat on 7 July 1995, Keeton scored a run of five victories to earn a shot at the British title for the first time.

British challenger and champion
Keeton's first fight for the British title ended in failure, losing to Terry Dunstan in the first round of their meeting at the York Hall in Bethnal Green on 11 May 1996. He earned another shot at the title on 16 December 2000, but lost once more, this time to Bruce Scott in the sixth round at the Sheffield Arena. His final unsuccessful fight for the title came on 1 June 2006 against Mark Hobson when the Commonwealth belt was also on the line at the Barnsley Metrodome. Success finally came Keeton's way on 20 October 2006, when the now vacant cruiserweight title was contested between himself and Lee Swaby resulting in a seventh round win and the championship belt. He lost the belt in his very first defence against former champion Mark Hobson on 29 September 2007, at the Hallam FM Arena in Sheffield.

Title wins and challenges
In between his challenges for the British title, Keeton won a number of fringe title belts including the WBO Inter-continental cruiserweight title against Garry Delaney on 23 January 1999 in Cheshunt and the WBF cruiserweight title against Jake Kilrain on 19 March 2003 in Slough. He challenged unsuccessfully for the WBO Inter-continental title prior to winning it, losing to the undefeated Kelly Oliver on 11 October 1997. He travelled to Poland to contest the WBC Youth World cruiserweight title on 11 June 2000 losing to Krzysztof Wlodarczyk (and travelled to Canada to challenge for the Commonwealth title losing to Troy Ross on 19 March 2007.

Prizefighter
After losing his British title to Mark Hobson in September 2007, Keeton took a break from the ring and only returned on 19 May 2009 to compete in the seventh Prizefighter tournament featuring the cruiserweights at Earls Court Exhibition Centre. He faced Bruce Scott in the first round, Keeton scored a knock down and won on points over three rounds. In the semi-finals he met Dean Francis, the former European and two-weight British champion, knocking him out in the first round.  The final of the tournament pitched Keeton against Ovill McKenzie, who he lost to on points.

References

1972 births
Living people
Cruiserweight boxers
Prizefighter contestants
Sportspeople from Sheffield
English male boxers